João Pedro Azevedo de Sousa Uva (born 19 May 1980 in Lisbon) is a former Portuguese rugby union footballer and a current coach. He played as a flanker.

He played  for Belenenses, where he won the Portuguese Cup in 2000-01, the Portuguese SuperCup in 2001-02, and the National Championship title in 2002-03 and 2007/08. for Bandeirantes Rugby Club, of São Paulo, Brazil, since February 2011.

He had 46 caps for Portugal, from 2000 to 2009, and scored 3 tries, 15 points in aggregate.

He was one of five Belenenses players in the Portugal squad at the 2007 Rugby World Cup finals, and he played in all four games, without scoring.

He has been the coach of Belenenses since 2014/15.

Notes

1980 births
Living people
Portuguese rugby union players
Portuguese rugby union coaches
Rugby union flankers
Rugby union players from Lisbon
Portugal international rugby union players
Sportspeople from Viana do Castelo District